The Catholicos of All Armenians (plural Catholicoi) (also known as the Armenian Pontiff (Վեհափառ, Vehapar or Վեհափառ Հայրապետ, Vehapar Hayrapet) and by #Other names), is the chief bishop and spiritual leader of Armenia's national church, the Armenian Apostolic Church, and the worldwide Armenian diaspora. According to tradition, the apostles Saint Thaddeus and Saint Bartholomew brought Christianity to Armenia in the first century.  Saint Gregory the Illuminator became the first Catholicos of All Armenians following the nation's adoption of Christianity as its official religion in 301 AD. The seat of the Catholicos, and the spiritual and administrative headquarters of the Armenian Church, is the Mother See of Holy Etchmiadzin, located in the city of Vagharshapat.

The Armenian Apostolic Church is part of the Oriental Orthodox communion. This communion includes the Coptic Orthodox Church of Alexandria, the Ethiopian Orthodox Tewahedo Church, the Syriac Orthodox Church, the Malankara Orthodox Syrian Church, and the Eritrean Orthodox Tewahedo Church.

The current Catholicos is Karekin II.

Other names
The Catholicos is often referred to both by the church and the media as the Armenian Pontiff. Historically, the Catholicos was known in English and other languages as the Armenian Patriarch or the Patriarch of Armenia, and sometimes as the Patriarch of Etchmiadzin (or Echmiadzin) to distinguish from the Armenian Patriarch of Constantinople and the Armenian Patriarch of Jerusalem. To distinguish from the Catholicos (or Patriarch) of Cilicia, historically based in Sis and now in Lebanon, he may be referred to as the Catholicos of Etchmiadzin. To underscore his supremacy over other patriarchs, the Catholicos is sometimes referred to in English as the Armenian Pope.

See also
Seats of the Catholicos of Armenians
Holy See of Cilicia
List of Catholicoi of Armenia
List of Armenian Catholicoi of Cilicia

References

External links
Official site of The Mother See of Holy Etchmiadzin